Little Women is a South Korean television series directed by Kim Hee-won, and starring Kim Go-eun, Nam Ji-hyun, and Park Ji-hu. Set in the modern day, it is loosely based on the 1868 novel of the same name by Louisa May Alcott. It aired from September 3 to October 9, 2022, on tvN's Saturdays and Sundays at 21:10 (KST) time slot. It is also available for streaming on Netflix in selected regions.

Synopsis
The series depicts the zeal of three poor sisters; In-ju, In-hye, and In-keong for money, independence, and love. One of the sister's supposedly dead friend left her 70 billion won but the people behind it, Korea's richest family, will do anything to stop them.

Cast and characters

Main
 Kim Go-eun as Oh In-ju
 Park So-yi as young Oh In-ju
 The eldest sister. She grew up in a terribly poor environment and is still poor. Ever since she was a young child, In-ju realized that money was the most important thing to protect herself and her family. Her dream is to live an ordinary life like other people. She gets involved in a case that could change her life.

 Nam Ji-hyun as Oh In-kyung
 The middle sister. She is an enthusiastic reporter at a news station. In-kyung believes in doing the right things. She also has always been poor, but grew up in a more comfortable environment, so money doesn't rule her life. She begins to dig into a mysterious case that she first faced when she first became a reporter.
 Park Ji-hu as Oh In-hye
 The youngest sister, who studies at a prestigious art high school due to her natural drawing skills, and sometimes feels that her sisters’ love for her is too much. Her sisters are her de facto parents and are fiercely protective of her.

Supporting

People around Oh In-kyung
 Kang Hoon as Ha Jong-ho
 Oh In-kyung's childhood friend and strong supporter, who has feelings for her.

 Cho Seung-yeon as Jo Wan-gyu
 Director of OBN Social Department.
 Gong Min-jeung as Jang Ma-ri
 A reporter at YBC news agency.

Family of three sisters
 Kim Mi-sook as Oh Hye-seok
 Great-aunt of the three sisters.
 Park Ji-young as Ahn Hee-yeon 
 Mother of the three sisters.
  as Oh Soo-bok

Wonryong's house
 Um Ki-joon as Park Jae-sang 
 A lawyer and rookie politician who gets involved with the three sisters.
 Uhm Ji-won as Won Sang-ah
 General's daughter, politician's wife and Director of the Museum of Art. Her relationship with the three sisters begins when Sang-ah's daughter Hyorin becomes involved with Oh In-hye.
 Jeon Chae-eun as Park Hyo-rin
Park Jae-sang and Won Sang-ah's daughter, and Oh In-hye's best friend.
 Lee Do-yeop as Won Ki-seon 
Security Commander in the 1980s and Won Sang-ah's father.
 Lee Min-woo as Won Sang-woo 
Won Ki-seon's son and Won Sang-ah's older brother. He was a son who didn't matter to his father.

Wonryong's group
 Wi Ha-joon as Choi Do-il
 He graduated from a prestigious university and becomes involved with Oh In-ju. He is a mysterious character whose true allegiance is unclear, though he is protective of In-ju.
 Park Bo-kyung as Go Soo-im 
Park Jae-sang's right-hand assistant.
 Jang Gwang as Jang Sa-pyoung
Principal of Wonryong School.

Extended
 Cho Yeon-jin as Hwang Bo-yeon
 Seong-yul as Soo-ha 
Go Soo-im's right-hand man.
 Kim Jung-pal as Lee Yong-gwi
 A veteran of the Vietnam War.
 Kim Myung-soo as Choi Hee-jae 
 Choi Do-il's father was a former war veteran.

Special appearances
 Choo Ja-hyun as Jin Hwa-young 
 In-ju's secret friend.
 Oh Jung-se as Director Shin / Shin Hyun-min
 A director who was suspected of having an affair with Hwa-young.
 Song Joong-ki as Park Joo-hyung
 An employee of a luxury shoe store.
 Adrian Pang as Calvin Ng
The manager of an unnamed hotel in Singapore.
 Joshua Tan as Hotel Receptionist
 Bridget Fernandez as Mrs Foster
 Ebi Shankara as Unnamed Cafe Waiter
 Na Chul as lawyer
A lawyer in charge of the state who came to help Oh In-ju.

Production

Development
In an interview with Tatler Asia on November 25, 2021, screenwriter Jeong Seo-kyung disclosed her involvement, "I'm working with the director of Vincenzo for a Korean adaptation of Little Women. The leading actresses are Kim Go-eun and Nam Ji-hyun while the male lead is Wi Ha-joon from Squid Game. I actually read the book, Little Women, when I was young and I really loved it."

Casting
On December 23, 2021, it was confirmed that tvN's series titled as Little Women directed by Kim Hee-won, written by Jeong Seo-kyung and produced by Studio Dragon, with Kim Go-eun, Nam Ji-hyun and Park Ji-hu as main leads. On October 19, 2021, MS Team Entertainment revealed that Wi Ha-joon was offered a role in the series. On the same day, it was reported that casting for the series was complete.

Filming
On March 3, 2022, it was confirmed that actor Wi Ha-joon had tested positive for COVID-19. He was expected to be released from quarantine on the 8th, and the diagnosis was confirmed when he was released.

Filming took place from June to July 2022; filming locations include various locations around Singapore.

Controversies

Plagiarism
On September 5, 2022, the staff issued an apology for the poster's resemblance to a Japanese beauty brand.

On September 8, 2022, the drama's poster maker Propaganda issued an official apology for the plagiarism of the poster similar to the exhibition poster of a Japanese cosmetics brand from 2016.

Ban in Vietnam

On October 3, 2022, Vietnam's Department of Radio, Television, and Electronic Information requested that Little Women be removed from the Vietnamese version of Netflix due to historical falsification of the Vietnam War. According to the Department's director, Lê Quang Tự Do, the series breached the Vietnamese media and cinema laws due to the actors' inaccurate statements about the Vietnam War in episodes 3 and 8, which distorted Vietnamese history by glorifying South Korea's involvement in the Vietnam War, including war crimes committed by South Korean soldiers.

On October 7, 2022, the drama staff apologized and promised to be more careful with both the social sensitivity and the production process in the future.

Original soundtrack

Part 1

Part 2

Viewership

References

External links
  
 Little Women at Daum 
 
 
 

2020s drama television series
2020s mystery television series
2022 South Korean television series debuts
2022 South Korean television series endings
Korean-language Netflix exclusive international distribution programming
South Korean mystery television series
Television series about sisters
Television series based on Little Women
Television series by Studio Dragon
Television shows filmed in Singapore
Television shows set in Seoul
Television episodes set in Singapore
TVN (South Korean TV channel) television dramas
Television episodes about Vietnam War
Television series about Vietnam War